Khoshkamrud-e Sofla (also Romanized as Khoshkamrūd-e Soflá and Khoshkemrūd-e Soflá; also known as Khoshkamrūd-e Pā’īn, Khoshkeh Marrūd-e Soflá, Khoshkeh Marūd, and Voshkamarū-ye Pā’īn) is a village in Yalghuz Aghaj Rural District, Serishabad District, Qorveh County, Kurdistan Province, Iran. At the 2006 census, its population was 321, in 88 families. The village is populated by Kurds.

References 

Towns and villages in Qorveh County
Kurdish settlements in Kurdistan Province